The 2022 Air Race World Championship was to be the fifteenth season of the Air Race World Championship, the first following the loss of title sponsor Red Bull and the first season held since the championship folded for the second time in 2019.

The championship was cancelled before a round was run in August 2022, with a re-launch planned for 2023.

Planned entrants

AeroGP1

Planned calendar

References

External links
 Official website

Red Bull Air Race World Championship seasons
Air Race
Air Race
Cancelled motorsport events